The Serbian Superliga ( / Superliga Srbije) is the highest level of men's volleyball in Serbia and it is organized by Serbian Volleyball Federation. Serbia Volleyball League is currently contested by 12 clubs.

2022–23 teams

Map

Champions

Including titles in Serbia and Montenegro

 1992 Vojvodina
 1993 Vojvodina
 1994 Vojvodina
 1995 Vojvodina
 1996 Vojvodina
 1997 Vojvodina
 1998 Vojvodina
 1999 Vojvodina
 2000 Vojvodina
 2001 Budvanska Rivijera Budva
 2002 Budućnost
 2003 Crvena zvezda
 2004 Vojvodina
 2005 Budućnost
 2006 Budućnost

Including titles in Serbia

 2007 Vojvodina
 2008 Crvena zvezda
 2009 Radnički Kragujevac (Credy Banka)
 2010 Radnički Kragujevac (Credy Banka)
 2011 Partizan
 2012 Crvena zvezda
 2013 Crvena zvezda
 2014 Crvena zvezda
 2015 Crvena zvezda
 2016 Crvena zvezda
 2017 Vojvodina
 2018 Vojvodina
 2019 Vojvodina
 2020 Vojvodina
 2021 Vojvodina
 2022 Vojvodina

All-time

External links 
 Official Website
 Official Website of Serbian Volleyball Federation

Serbia
Volleyball in Serbia
Sports leagues established in 2006
2006 establishments in Serbia
Professional sports leagues in Serbia